Adolf Tandler, also Adolph, (born November 2, 1875 in Vienna) was a conductor of the Los Angeles Symphony Orchestra, which predated the Los Angeles Philharmonic.

Tandler moved to Los Angeles in 1908, and from November 1913 to 1920 led the symphony orchestra, after which it dissolved. He then transitioned to composing film scores, with credits for Scarface and Queen Kelly. He died (suicide by vehicle exhaust) with his daughter, crippled with arthritis since she was 14 years old, on September 30, 1953, in the Eagle Rock, Los Angeles area.

References

External links

1875 births
1953 deaths
Musicians from Vienna
Austro-Hungarian emigrants to the United States
American conductors (music)
American film score composers
Suicides in California